Don Fulgencio is a 1950 Argentine film.

Cast

External links
 

1950 films
1950s Spanish-language films
Argentine black-and-white films
Films based on Argentine comics
Live-action films based on comics
Films directed by Enrique Cahen Salaberry
1950s Argentine films